Kim Chang-hae (born 4 July 1968) is a North Korean speed skater. She competed in two events at the 1984 Winter Olympics.

References

External links
 

1968 births
Living people
North Korean female speed skaters
Olympic speed skaters of North Korea
Speed skaters at the 1984 Winter Olympics
Place of birth missing (living people)